Austin Diamond (10 July 1874 – 5 August 1966) was a cricketer who played first-class cricket for New South Wales from 1899 to 1918, including 14 matches as captain.  

A disciplined and determined batsman, Diamond had his best season in 1906–07, when he scored 502 runs at an average of 83.66, including his only double-century, 210 not out against Victoria. Diamond captained the unofficial Australian tour to Fiji, Canada and the US from May to September 1913. The tour included five first-class matches, as well as many minor matches. 

He served as a lieutenant with the 18th Australian Infantry Battalion in World War I. He played one last first-class match during the 1918–19 season.

See also
 List of New South Wales representative cricketers

References

External links
 
 

1874 births
1966 deaths
People from Marsden, West Yorkshire
New South Wales cricketers
English emigrants to Australia
Australian cricketers
Australian military personnel of World War I